There are several lakes named Mud Lake within the Canadian province of Alberta.

 Mud Lake, located near Fort Macleod, Municipal District of Willow Creek No. 26.	
 Mud Lake, Banff National Park.	 
 Mud Lake, Kananaskis Improvement District.	
This lake is located within the Peter Lougheed Provincial Park of Alberta.
 Mud Lake, Elk Island National Park.	 
 Mud Lake, located near Grosmont, Athabasca County.	
 Mud Lake, located near Conner Creek, Division No. 13, Alberta.	
 Mud Lake, Wood Buffalo National Park.

References
 Canadian Geographical Names Data Base

Lakes of Alberta